Jarosław Jaros (born 2 January 1978 in Zgorzelec) - Polish cabaret actor.

He performed with Grzegorz Halama at Grzegorz Halama Oklasky.

Currently he performs a program: Żule i bandziory.

In 1998 he initiated Kabaret Słuchajcie – a cabaret.

Filmography
Movie director
 2000 - Pizza country
 2000 - ?
 2000 - Paka jestem
 2003 - Plica
 2003 - Sklep

Scenario
 2000 - Pizza country
 2000 - Taka jestem

Photos
 2000 - Pizza country
 2000 - ?
 2000 - Taka jestem
 2003 - Kita
 2003 - Szkoła
 2003 - Małżonka

Movie editing
 2000 - Pizza country
 2000 - ?
 2000 - Taka jestem
 2003 - Małżonka

Actor
 2000 - Taka jestem
 2000 - Wizja - voice from heaven
 2000 - Dwóch ludzi z szybą
 2000 - Hormony
 2000 - Oświadczyny
 2001 - Senne marzenie
 2003 - Baśń o ludziach stąd - as drunk man, driver
 2003 - Ulica
 2003 - Sklep

Dubbing
 2007 - Było sobie porno - various voices

Postproduction
 1999 - Dr Jekyll i Mr Hyde według Wytwórni A'YoY

External links
 Official Jarosław Jaros' page
 Jarosław Jaros at filmweb.pl
 Jarosław Jaros' Wikiquotes (in Polish)

1978 births
Living people
Polish male actors